Culion, officially the Municipality of Culion,  is a 3rd class municipality in the province of Palawan, Philippines. According to the 2020 census, it has a population of 23,213 people.

Culion consists primarily of Culion Island as well as 41 minor surrounding islands, as part of the Calamian group of islands.

It was a former leprosarium, starting in 1906 under the American colonial regime until the American commonwealth of the Philippines era. Although leprosy on the island-town was abolished in the 1980s, it was only in 2006 when it was declared a leprosy-free area by the World Health Organization. The municipality was created by virtue of Republic Act No. 7193 on February 19, 1992. In May 2017, the Philippine National Commission for UNESCO began its initiative to prepare the dossier of Culion's leprosy documentary heritage, which will be nominated in the future in the UNESCO Memory of the World Programme. In May 2018, the Culion Museum and Archives was officially nominated by the Philippines in the UNESCO Memory of the World Register – Asia and the Pacific. On June 18, 2018, Culion Leprosy Archives was officially inscribed to the Memory of the World Register – Asia and the Pacific. The government and the Asia-Pacific bloc aims to nominate the archives further to the International Memory of the World Register. If approved by UNESCO, it will be the fifth internationally recognized documentary heritage of the Philippines, increasing Culion town's feasibility to become a World Heritage Site in the future.

History

Spanish colonial period

Aside from churches, the Spaniards built defensive fortifications in strategic places in Taytay, Cuyo, Agutaya, Linapacan, including a watch tower and fort in the locality of Libis in Culion.

In 1858, Calamianes was divided into 2 provinces, "Castilla" and "Asturias". Castilla, which included northern Palawan, retained its capital of Taytay. Asturias extended south to Balabac. In 1873, the capital of Palawan was changed from Taytay to Cuyo. The French anthropologist Alfred Marche traveled the Philippines and documented his research of many places. French Ambassador Pirre Revol in particular translated Marche's account of the Calamianes, and Culion.

Marche refers to Culion as the principal village of the Calamianes. The fact that a boat from Manila "touches Culion once a month" attests to the growing economy of the place at that time. Marche's description of the place and people he met in the 1880s are important indicators of the ethnography of Calamianes since more than a hundred years ago.

The primacy of Culion as a leading settlement community of the Calamianes is further supported by the fact that a Justice of the peace resided and held office in Culion. Claudio Sandoval y Rodriguez a Spanish mestizo from Jaro, Iloilo married Evarista Manlavi daughter of a rich landowner from Cuyo. Claudio Sandoval became Jezgado de Paz de Culion, Calamianes and held office sometime in the late 1880s. The seal of Claudio's office was found stamped on handwritten circular dated December 11, 1889 that he sent to all within Culion's "roriedad y sus visitas" warning residents of the penalties that will be imposed on them should they be caught gambling. Culion's "visitas" included the island of Busuanga and other areas in Calamianes.

A remnant of the fort in San Pedro located somewhere in Burabud is a testimony of a rich history of Culion. In the early 1990s, it was thought that this fort was already invaded by the roots of balete trees. This was built by the Spanish friars (Augustinian Recollects) and is older than the one we now see in Culion proper, the Immaculate Conception Church built by the Jesuits. This fort in San Pedro was more or less built on the same span of time as that of the forts in Agutaya, Taytay and Cuyo which all still stand today preserved by the Palawan government.

American commonwealth and Culion as a leprosarium

When the treaty of Paris was signed on December 10, 1898, wherein Spain sold the Philippines to the United States for 20 million dollars, the funding of Culion as a reservation is closely related to the early efforts of the Americans to establish some form of public health policy in the Philippines as part of their long-term intentions to occupy the archipelago.

One of the motivating factors for the creation of the Manila Board of Health was traditional belief that the maintenance of public health required the isolation of cases of leprosy from the rest of the public. After an investigation of a number of sites, the island of Culion was selected as a segregation colony in 1901. On October 27, 1902, the Second Philippine Commission appropriated an initial amount of $50,000 for the establishment of Culion under the Secretary of Interior Dean C. Worcester and Director of Health Victor G. Heiser. On August 22, 1904, Luke E. Wright, the American Civil Governor of the Government of the Philippine Islands, signed Executive Order No. 35 which transferred the jurisdiction and control of Culion from the Municipality of Coron, reserving the same as a leper colony and a government stock farm.

Timeline
On May 27, 1906, the first contingent of 370 patients from Cebu was brought to Culion by two Coast Guard cutters, the Polilio and the Mindanao.
On September 12, 1907, Act 1711 of the Philippine Commission was passed that gave full responsibility to the Director of Health for the compulsory segregation of the lepers, and confinement and treatment in Culion.
Between 1906 and 1910 the Americans rounded up 5,303 leprosy afflicted individuals and brought them to the colony. On July 18, 1912, acting Governor General Newton Gilbert signed EO No. 35 in which he further defined the territory of the leper colony and government stock farm.
In 1913, a special coinage issue was minted in aluminum by a private firm for the inmates of the Colony.  Further special coinage issues would be minted for them at the Manila Mint from 1920 to 1930.  A special paper money issue was generated during World War II for their use as well.
In 1917, Section 1066 of Act No. 2711 (Revised Administrative Act) provided that the Department Head through the Director of Health shall have jurisdiction over the colony and its waters for the efficient management of the sanitarium.
On June 18, 1952, Congress passed R.A. No. 753 which transferred administrative control to the Director of Hospitals. In 1964, the Secretary of Health again took administrative control and enforcement of rules and regulations over all the lands and waters of Culion Leper Colony as provided under Section 106 of the Revised Administrative Code. Sections 1060 to 1071 of RA no. 753 was later repealed by Republic Act No. 4073, an Act further liberalizing the Treatment of Leprosy by Amending and Repealing Certain Sections of the Revised Administrative Code, resulting in the loss of jurisdiction by the Department of Health over the natural resources of Culion.
In 1979, a Culion Committee was created under Letter of Instructions No. 796. The Ministry of Human Settlements conceived and organized in 1982 an alternative development approach for residents of Culion under the Culion Development Project (CDP). This was later amended by Executive Order No. 241 on July 24, 1987, that transferred the said committee and the CDP to the Palawan Integrated Area Development Project (PIADP) of the National Council on Integrated Area Development (NACIAD). This transfer did not however affect the jurisdiction of DOH over the Culion Leper Colony.
On June 22, 1988, Congress passed R.A. No. 6659 that authorized qualified residents of Culion Leper Colony to vote for the elective provincial officials of the Province of Palawan. In 1991, Speaker Ramon Mitra and House Representative David Ponce De Leon introduced a house bill for the creation of the Municipality of Culion. On February 12, 1992, President Corazon C. Aquino signed Republic Act 7193 creating the Municipality of Culion in the Province of Palawan.
May 8, 1995 was when the first election of municipal and barangay officials of Culion was held resulting in the election of Mr. Hilarion M. Guia and Mr. Emiliano Marasigan Jr. as its first duly elected Mayor and Vice Mayor, respectively.
On October 29, 1998, through Department of Health Administrative Order No. 20-A Series of 1998, administrative control and authority over the Municipality of Culion was officially transferred from the Department of Health to the Municipality ending nearly one century of administrative control by the health department over Culion Island.

On March 12, 2001, Republic Act 9032 signed by President Gloria Macapacal Arroyo expanded the area of jurisdiction of the Municipality of Culion, Province of Palawan, amending for the purpose Republic Act 7193. The barangays of Balala, Baldat, Binudac, Culango, Galoc, Jardin, Libis, Luac, Malaking Patag, Osmeña and Tiza were declared legally existent upon the creation of the Municipality of Busuanga to the Municipality of Culion. Barangays Burabod and Halsey were transferred from the Municipality of Busuanga to the Municipality of Culion subject to ratification by plebiscite in the two municipalities of Culion and Busuanga. Barangay Carabao for the Tagbanua indigenous cultural community was likewise created subject to ratification by plebiscite in Culion.
While on July 15, 2002, plebiscites held in Culion and Busuanga simultaneously with the election of barangay officials and Sangguniang Kabataan representatives resulted in the ratification of the transfer of Halsey and Burabod to Culion and the creation of Barangay Carabao.
In May 2018, the Culion Museum and Archives was nominated by the Philippines to the Memory of the World Register – Asia and the Pacific. The archive's declaration of passage or failure will be announced on a later date.
 June 18, 2018, the Culion Leprosy Archives was officially inscribed to the Memory of the World Register – Asia and the Pacific.

Geography
Culion is an island situated at the northernmost part of Palawan. It is part of the Calamian Archipelago in northern Palawan that also includes the municipalities of Busuanga, Coron, and Linapacan. During the Spanish Period, these were known as Las Islas de Calamianes, Provincia de España.

It is bounded on the north by Busuanga Island, on the east by the Coron Reef, on the south by Linapacan Island, and on the west by the South China Sea.

The Culion sea is teeming with a total of 201 fish species including commercially important fish like Lapu-lapu (Groupers), Kanuping (Sweetlip Emperor), Maya-Maya (Snapper), Tanguige (Spanish Mackerel), Dalagang Bukid (Blue and Gold Fusiliers) and Bisugo (Breams). Squid, cuttlefish, shrimps, crabs, shellfish and sea cucumber or trepang are plentiful.

Three ecosystems sustain the rich marine life of Culion: mangroves, seagrass, and corals. 17 mangrove species cover the coastline of Culion. 9 seagrass species and 47 coral genera representing 60% of the total genera found in the Philippines are found in Culion.

Barangays
Culion is politically subdivided into 14 barangays:

 Balala
 Baldat
 Binudac
 Burabod
 Culango
 De Carabao
 Galoc
 Halsey
 Jardin
 Libis
 Luac
 Malaking Patag
 Osmeña
 Tiza

Climate

Demographics

The original people of Culion are the Tagbanuas, a cultural minority group that lives by fishing and food gathering. While preserving their native customs and traditions, the Tagbanuas are greatly influenced by Muslim culture and social organization.

Early trading activities attracted people from other parts of Palawan, like Calamianen and Cuyonon, who came and stayed in Culion as their new home.

Today, however, the Tagbanuas no longer practice many of their cultural traditions and many of them have been converted to Christianity. They are largely marginalized, making up only about 8% of Culion's total population. Barangay Carabao, under Republic Act 9032, was established for these indigenous people. They were also granted Certificates of Ancestral Domain under Republic Act 8371, also known as the Indigenous Peoples' Rights Act of 1997.

The establishment of the leper colony in 1906, Hansenites and hospital staff were brought to Culion from different parts of the Philippines bringing their customs, habits, dialects, and regional characteristics, and the influx of migrants in the last three decades have understandably made Culion an heterogeneous population.

Economy

In popular culture 
The 2019 film Culion depicts the island's history during the 1940s when the disease was considered a life sentence.

References

External links

 Culion Profile at PhilAtlas.com
 [ Philippine Standard Geographic Code]
Philippine Census Information
Local Governance Performance Management System

Municipalities of Palawan
Calamian Islands
Culion leper colony
Island municipalities in the Philippines